"I've Been to the Mountaintop" is the popular name of the last speech delivered by Martin Luther King Jr.

King spoke on April 3, 1968, at the Mason Temple (Church of God in Christ Headquarters) in Memphis, Tennessee.

The speech primarily concerns the Memphis sanitation strike. King calls for unity, economic actions, boycotts, and nonviolent protest, while challenging the United States to live up to its ideals. At the end of the speech, he discusses the possibility of an untimely death.

Excerpts from King's speech 
Regarding the strike, King stated that

He warned the protesters not to engage in violence lest the issue of injustice be ignored because of the focus on the violence. King argued that peaceful demonstrations were the best course of action, the only way to guarantee that their demands would be heard and answered.

Regarding the Civil Rights Movement, King demanded that the United States defend for all its citizens what is promised in the United States Constitution and the Declaration of Independence and stated that he would never give up until these natural rights were protected, saying

Regarding economic boycotts, King advocated boycotting white goods as a means of nonviolent protest. He said that the individual Negro is poor but together they are an economic powerhouse, and they should use this power to stop support for racist groups and instead empower black businesses. Although the industries might not listen to protests, they would be forced to listen to boycotts lest they be driven out of business. King named several businesses as targets for the boycott:

Toward the end of the speech, King refers to threats against his life and uses language that presciently foreshadowed his impending death, but reaffirming that he was not afraid to die:

Biblical references 
The 'prophetic' language used by King referred to events described in the Biblical book of Deuteronomy. In it, Moses, the leader of the people of Israel, leads them to life in the Promised Land. Before they reach it, however, Moses is informed by God that, because of an incident in which he did not follow God's directions, he will not reach the land himself, but will only see it from a distance.

Shortly after, Moses dies, and his successor Joshua leads them into the Promised Land.

See also
 The Mountaintop (play about King's last day)

References

External links
 Martin Luther King Jr.: "I've Been to the Mountaintop" (Full text)

1968 in the United States
1968 in Tennessee
Speeches by Martin Luther King Jr.
Assassination of Martin Luther King Jr.
April 1968 events in the United States
1968 speeches
1968 neologisms